Beit Uziel is a religious moshav in Israel. Located near Rehovot, it falls under the jurisdiction of Gezer Regional Council.

History
The village was founded in 1956 by Jews who had emigrated from Morocco and from India. Agricultural pursuits include vineyards, poultry farming chicken coops, and greenhouses.

References

External links
Official website 

Moshavim
Populated places established in 1956
Populated places in Central District (Israel)
1956 establishments in Israel
Indian-Jewish culture in Israel
Moroccan-Jewish culture in Israel